Cerbăl is a commune in Hunedoara County, Transylvania, Romania. It is composed of eight villages: Arănieș (Aranyos), Cerbăl, Feregi (Feresd), Merișoru de Munte (Meresd), Poienița Tomii (Pojenicatomi), Poiana Răchițelii (Pojánarekiceli), Socet (Szocsed) and Ulm (Ulm).

References

Communes in Hunedoara County
Localities in Transylvania